Kamune is a settlement in Murang'a County of Kenya's Central Province. As of 2019, it had a population of 4,084 across 1,277 households.

This is home for a legendary film-maker Samuel Njoroge a.k.a Muhindi who made one hitting movie in his vernacular, "Ngucanio Pt. I & II". It is also a home for another legendary Member of Parliament Hon. Clement Wambugu Muchiri. Kamune is in a newly created location known as Gathunya.

References 

Populated places in Central Province (Kenya)